Eucalyptus chloroclada, commonly known as Baradine gum, red gum or dirty gum, is a species of small to medium-sized tree that is endemic to eastern Australia. It usually has fibrous to flaky bark on the trunk and smooth bark above, lance-shaped adult leaves, flower buds in groups of seven, white flowers and hemispherical fruit.

Description
It has rough, finely fibrous to flaky bark on the trunk and smooth white to cream-coloured bark above. Some specimens in Queensland lack rough bark. Flowering occurs between August and December and the flowers are white.

Taxonomy and naming
Baradine gum was first formally described in 1934 by William Blakely who gave it the name Eucalyptus dealbata var. chloroclada and published the description in his book "
A Key to the Eucalypts. In 1988 Lawrie Johnson and Ken Hill changed the name to E. chloroclada and the updated name was published in Volume 19 of Flora of Australia. The specific epithet (chloroclada) is derived from the Ancient Greek words chloros meaning "green" and klados meaning "branch", "twig" or "stem".

Distribution and habitat
Eucalyptus chloroclada mainly grows on sandy plains and on hills in woodland, usually with Callitris species. It occurs on the western slopes and plains of New South Wales mainly from the Pilliga forest and Gilgandra, north to Dirranbandi in south-east Queensland.

References

chloroclada
Myrtales of Australia
Flora of New South Wales
Flora of Queensland
Trees of Australia
Plants described in 1934